GreenWing International was an American aircraft manufacturer, based in Cable, California, producing electric aircraft.

GreenWing International was founded to produce the eSpyder E280 and e430 electric aircraft designed by Yuneec International.

The eSpyder E280 received German DULV certification in February 2013. The company exhibited at AERO Friedrichshafen show in 2013 and eSpyder production was to have started in that same year.

The company's last news release was in December 2013 and it is indicated as "permanently closed".

Aircraft

References

External links
Official website archives on Archive.org

Electric aircraft
Homebuilt aircraft
Yuneec aircraft